The IBM ThinkPad T41 is a laptop from the ThinkPad line that was manufactured by IBM.

References

External links 

 thinkwiki.de - T41

IBM laptops
ThinkPad